Ladislaus Kurpiel (13 November 1883 – 24 June 1930) was an Austrian footballer who played as a midfielder for DFC Prag in the inaugural German football championship in 1903. He had a brief spell at Vienna Cricket and Football Club, and also represented the Austria national football team on eight occasions between 1908 and 1912. He also competed at the 1912 Summer Olympics.

References

External links
 
 
 

1883 births
1930 deaths
Austrian footballers
Austria international footballers
Association football midfielders
Olympic footballers of Austria
Footballers at the 1912 Summer Olympics
DFC Prag players
Footballers from Prague